Tuồng cải lương (Hán-Nôm: 從改良) often referred to as cải lương (Chữ Hán: 改良), roughly "reformed theater") is a form of modern folk opera in Vietnam. It blends southern Vietnamese folk songs, classical music, hát tuồng (a classical theatre form based on Chinese opera), and modern spoken drama.

History and description

Cải lương originated in Southern Vietnam in the early 20th century and blossomed in the 1930s as a theatre of the middle class during the country's French colonial period. Cải lương is now promoted as a national theatrical form. Unlike the other folk forms, it continued to prove popular with the masses as late as the 1970s and the 1980s, although it is now in decline.

Cải lương can be compared to a sort of play with the added aspect of Vọng cổ. This term literally means "nostalgia for the past", it is a special type of singing with the background music often being the đàn tranh zither or the đàn ghi-ta (Vietnamized guitar). In a typical cải lương play, the actresses and actors would use a combination of regular spoken dialogue and vọng cổ to express their thoughts and emotions.

Cải lương normally highlights/praises Vietnamese moral values. There are mainly two types of cải lương: cải lương tuồng cổ (ancient) and cải lương xã hội (modern).
[[File:Đàn Guita phím lõm.jpg|thumb|The Guitar phím lõm" – instrument used for Cải lương]]Cải lương xã hội ("society reformed theater" 改良 社會) consists of stories about modern Vietnamese society. The plots deal with a romantic love story blended with family or social relationships. The stories also explore cultural norms, social norms, and other aspects of Vietnamese society, e.g. Đời Cô Lựu, Tô Ánh Nguyệt. This type can be somehow described as tragedy, but with a happy ending. However, a few cải lương xã hội such as "Ra Giêng Anh Cưới Em" are comedic and light.

In Cải lương tuồng cổ, The actor/actress dresses in an old fashioned costume. The plot is based on a tale, legend or historical story of the feudal system, where kings and warriors still existed. For example, Bên Cầu Dệt Lụa, Lục Vân Tiên, Tiếng Trống Mê Linh etc. Many plots come from Chinese historic or ancient legends. Lương Sơn Bá-Chúc Anh Đài is based on the Chinese legend of butterfly lovers. In Cải lương tuồng cổ, Hồ Quảng a kind of Chinese opera may be mixed. Hence, some Cải lương tuồng cổ may be called Cải lương Hồ Quảng, which is more like a musical. In addition to regular speech, ca cải lương, and Vọng cổ, several melodies are incorporated into the play. These melodies are reused through different plays, however the words are changed to fit the context of the plays. Cải lương tuồng cổ'' can be characterized by beautiful, elaborate costumes comprising beautiful and colorful dress pieces; large, beautiful glittery hairpieces; elaborate warrior armor; and elaborate warrior head pieces.

Notable singers

Before 1975

 Tám Danh (1901-1976)
 Ba Du (1904-1980)
 Năm Phỉ (1906-1954)
 Năm Châu (1906-1977)
 Ba Vân (1908-1988)
 Phùng Há (1911-2009)
 Tư Sạng (1911-1955)
 Bảy Nam (1913-2004)
 Út Trà Ôn (1919-2001)
 Lê Thanh Trí (1924-2002)
 Viễn Châu (1924-2016)
 Kim Chưởng (1926-2014)
 Văn Chung (1928-2018)
 Hữu Phước (1932-1997)
 Phi Hùng (born 1932) 
 Thành Được (born 1934)
 Út Bạch Lan (1935-2016)
 Hùng Cường (1936-1996)
 Thanh Hương (1936-1974)
 Kim Cương (born 1937)
 Nam Hùng (1937-2020)
 Minh Cảnh (born 1938)
 Tấn Tài (1938-2011)
 Ngọc Nuôi (1939-2002)
 Út Hiền (1940-1986)
 Diệp Lang (born 1941)
 Dũng Thanh Lâm (1942-2004)
 Ngọc Hương (1942-2017)
 Thanh Nga (1942-1978)
 Kim Ngọc (1944-2011)
 Thanh Sang (1943-2017)
 Phương Quang (1942-2018)
 Thanh Thanh Hoa (1943-2009)
 Minh Phụng (1944-2008)
 Bạch Tuyết (born 1945)
 Hồng Nga (born 1945)
 Ngọc Giàu (born 1945)
 Diệu Hiền (born 1945)
 Phương Bình (born 1947)
 Phượng Liên (born 1947)
 Thanh Nguyệt (born 1947)
 Bo Bo Hoàng (born 1947)
 Thanh Tòng (1948-2016)
 Lệ Thủy (born 1948)
 Thanh Tuấn (born 1948)
 Minh Vương (born 1949)
 Bảo Quốc (born 1949)
 Mỹ Châu (born 1950)
 Tô Kim Hồng (born 1950)
 Bạch Lê (born 1951)
 Chí Tâm (born 1952)
 Giang Châu (1952-2019)
 Bích Hạnh (born 1953)
 Thoại Miêu (born 1953)
 Thanh Kim Huệ (1954-2021)
 Hương Lan (born 1956)

After 1975

 Phượng Mai (born 1956)
 Vũ Linh (1958-2023)
 Tài Linh
 Châu Thanh
 Thanh Hằng
 Phương Hồng Thủy
 Linh Tâm
 Thanh Thanh Tâm
 Phượng Hằng
 Phượng Loan
 Cẩm Tiên 
 Kim Tử Long
 Thoại Mỹ
 Vũ Luân
 Chí Linh
 Vân Hà
 Tú Sương 
 Trinh Trinh
 Lê Thanh Thảo
 Quế Trân
 Ngọc Huyền
 Thanh Ngân
 Trọng Phúc
 Tấn Giao
 Kim Tiểu Long
 Phi Nhung (1970-2021)
 Mạnh Quỳnh
 Hương Thủy
 Linh Tuấn
 Thanh Huyền

See also
Music of Vietnam
Cao Văn Lầu songwriter
Dạ cổ hoài lang "Night song of the missing husband" 1919
Vọng cổ "nostalgia"

References

External links

Encyclopedia of Vietnamese Music (wiki)
archive.is
Cai Luong Vietnam
Dan Ca Viet
Video cai luong
The best reformed theater songs    | Các bài tân cổ cải lương hay nhất

Vietnamese traditional theatre
Dance in Vietnam
Vietnamese music
Vietnamese styles of music
Masterpieces of the Oral and Intangible Heritage of Humanity
Folk opera